Johnny Panic are a punk rock band from London, formed in 2002.

Band members
Rob Solly - Guitar (founder member)
Jonny Shock - Percussion (founder member)
Matt James - Guitar and backing vocals (founder member)
Sean Mannion - Bass and backing vocals

Past members
Nash Francis - Bass and backing vocals (founder member)

History
Johnny Panic were founded in 2002. Their music can be described as rock music, inspired by bands such as The Clash and The Jam. Following the release of several singles, the band's debut album The Violent Dazzling was released in 2005. Soon after Nash Francis left the band later to become a painter and was replaced by Sean Mannion. Their second album, The Good Fight, was released in November 2007 on Repeat Records and was preceded by the single "Dislocation" on 29 October.

In 2006 their track "I Live For" was used in the soundtrack to the video game Test Drive Unlimited, and their cover of The Turtles' hit "Happy Together" was used in an npower television commercial. Their name comes from the short story Johnny Panic and the Bible of Dreams by Sylvia Plath.

The band finally released their third album, "Ritual Riots" on 26 September 2011. This has been preceded by the single "The World Around You", released on 16 September 2011.

Discography

Albums

Singles

References

External links
Official website

English rock music groups
Musical groups established in 2002
2002 establishments in the United Kingdom